The First pandemic may refer to:

First plague pandemic (541), also known as the Plague of Justinian
First cholera pandemic (1817–1824)

See also
"Pandemic" (South Park), 2008 season 12 episode 10, part 1 of 2, preceding the next episode "Pandemic 2"
Pandemic (disambiguation)
Second pandemic (disambiguation)
Third pandemic (disambiguation)
Fourth pandemic
Fifth pandemic
Sixth pandemic
Seventh pandemic